Limnaecia arsitricha is a moth in the family Cosmopterigidae, which lives in Samoa.

References

Natural History Museum Lepidoptera generic names catalog

Limnaecia
Moths described in 1927
Moths of Oceania
Taxa named by Edward Meyrick